A South Pacific tropical cyclone is a non-frontal, low pressure system that has developed, within an environment of warm sea surface temperatures and little vertical wind shear aloft in the South Pacific Ocean. Within the Southern Hemisphere there are officially three areas where tropical cyclones develop on a regular basis, these areas are the South-West Indian Ocean between Africa and 90°E, the Australian region between 90°E and 160°E and the South Pacific basin between 160°E and 120°W. The South Pacific basin between 160°E and 120°W is officially monitored by the Fiji Meteorological Service and New Zealand's MetService, while others like the Australian Bureau of Meteorology and the United States National Oceanic and Atmospheric Administration also monitor the basin. Each tropical cyclone year within this basin starts on July 1 and runs throughout the year, encompassing the tropical cyclone season which runs from November 1 and lasts until April 30 each season. Within the basin, most tropical cyclones have their origins within the South Pacific Convergence Zone or within the Northern Australian monsoon trough, both of which form an extensive area of cloudiness and are dominant features of the season.

Basin history
Tropical cyclones have occurred over the southern Pacific Ocean for thousands of years, with Polynesians and other ancient mariners having some knowledge of them. These mariners were keen observers of nature with their knowledge of these systems, reflected by traditional myths and legends. When Europeans started to settle and colonise the South Pacific, they realised that the region was not free of hurricanes were the first to publish accounts about the systems. During 1853, Thomas Dobson subsequently became the first person to collect information about these systems, in order to attempt to understand and explain the characteristics of 24 tropical cyclones. However, these descriptions were vague and of little value, because he only had a small amount of data and no synoptic weather charts.

Over the next 40 years various reports, journals and logbooks on the storms were published, before E. Knipping consolidated some of these reports and extended Dobson's list out to 120 tropical cyclones during 1893. During the 1920s Stephen Sargent Visher did some research into tropical cyclones in the Pacific and visited several island nations, including Fiji, Japan and the Philippines, to obtain information on potential systems. He also consulted various journals and reports as well as Dobson's and Knipping's work, before he authored a number of papers on tropical cyclones in the Pacific. These papers contained information about 259 tropical storms in the South Pacific between 160°E and 140°W, two of which occurred during 1789 and 1819, while the rest occurred between 1830 and 1923. Visher also tried to estimate how many systems were occurring on an annual basis in each area, but overcompensated for his incomplete records and came up with a figure of 12 severe tropical cyclones per year.

In the years building up to World War II, Visher's work became the primary source for information about tropical cyclones in the South Pacific. However, there was not enough information available to allow for an accurate depiction of tropical cyclone tracks

During Visher's time and until the start of World War II, there was not enough. However, in the build-up to and during World War II, meteorological operations in the Pacific were greatly expanded, to meet the needs of international aviation and military operations. As a result, J W Hutchings decided to write a paper on 43 tropical cyclones between 1940 and 1951, using data that had been collected from the tropics by the New Zealand Meteorological Service in the area between the 150°E and 150°W. In the paper, systems were only included if they had a wind speed on the Beaufort scale of Force 9 or above (corresponding to a medium Category 1 on the Australian cyclone scale), while located between the Equator and 30°S. Hutchings also examined where tropical cyclones originated from in the South Pacific and claimed that the place where most tropical cyclones develop could be accurately determined. The paper also drew attention to a marked difference in the tracks of South Pacific tropical cyclones and systems in other basins. This work was subsequently extended in 1956, by the then director of the New Zealand Meteorological Service: John Fletcher Gabites, to cover the seasons between 1952–53 and 1955–56. Gabites subsequently wrote a series of papers during 1963 on various aspects of South Pacific tropical cyclones including on the wide variety of tracks that occur over the Pacific.

At the start of the 1980s, geostationary satellite imagery became available, which allowed meteorologists to closely monitor any developments and lowered the chances of missing a well developed tropical cyclone to nil.  
During June 1995, the Fiji Meteorological Service's Nadi — Tropical Cyclone Centre, was designated as a Regional Specialized Meteorological Center by the World Meteorological Organization.

Seasons
Pre 1900 South Pacific cyclone seasons
1900–1939 South Pacific cyclone seasons
1939–1969 South Pacific cyclone seasons

1970s

1980s
During the 1980s there were three major Southern Oscillation episodes; two El Niño's (1982–83 and 1986/87) when the Southern Oscillation Index (SOI) was negative and one La Nina when the SOI was positive.

1990s

2000s
During the 2000s, activity was generally below the long term average, with 60 tropical cyclones developing out of 160 tropical disturbances and tropical depressions. However activity during the 2002–03, 2004–05 and 2009–10 seasons all experienced activity, near the long term average of about 8 - 9 tropical cyclones.

2010s

2020s

See also

Tropical cyclone
List of retired South Pacific cyclone names
Atlantic hurricane season
Pacific hurricane season
Pacific typhoon season
North Indian Ocean tropical cyclone
South-West Indian Ocean tropical cyclone
Australian region tropical cyclone
South Atlantic tropical cyclone
Mediterranean tropical-like cyclone

Notes

References

External links